Neofusicoccum arbuti is a fungus species in the genus Neofusicoccum. It was first described by D.F. Farr & M. Elliott, and given its current name by Crous, Slippers & A.J.L. Phillips in 2006.  Neofusicoccum arbuti is included in the genus Neofusicoccum and the family Botryosphaeriaceae. This species is known as madrone canker. 
N. arbuti is a potentially lethal canker disease of Pacific madrone, Arbutus menziesii. 

No subspecies are listed in the Catalogue of Life.

References 

Botryosphaeriaceae
Fungi described in 2006